Colosimo is an Italian surname. Notable people with the surname include:

 Big Jim Colosimo (1878–1920), Italian organized crime figure
 Gaspare Colosimo (1859–1940), Italian jurist and politician
 Simon Colosimo (born 1979), Australian soccer player
 Vince Colosimo (born 1966), Australian actor

See also
 Colosimi

Surnames of Italian origin
Toponymic surnames